Bhairon may refer to:

Gods
Bhairava, an aspect of the Indian god Siva
Bhaironji, a Hindu god of the underworld

Music
Bhairav (raga), Indian raga